The Taipei Metro Xiangshan station is a metro station on the Red Line located in Xinyi, Taipei, Taiwan. The station opened on November 24, 2013.

Station overview
The two-level, underground station with an island platform. It is located beneath Xinyi Rd., Sec. 5 east of Songren Rd. and near the north end of Zhongqiang Park and the Xinyi Expressway. It is the planned eastern terminus of the Xinyi Line when it initially opened for service. The Xinyi Eastern Extension, when completed, will extend eastward from this station. The Xiangshan hiking trail is located nearby the station.

History
The construction of the station began in July 2005. It had completed in November 2013. The Circular line is planned to make an out-of-station interchange with the Tamsui-Xinyi line at this station.

Construction
It has three entrances, two elevators for the disabled, and two vent shafts.

Due to space limitations caused by the Xinyi Expressway, a vehicle overpass, and Taiwan Power Company culverts, the station was constructed using the pipe jacking method instead of the usual cut-and-cover method.

First and Last Train Timing 
The first and last train timing for Xiangshan station  is as follows:

Station layout

Public Art
The design theme for the station is "Song of tree frogs - presentation of geographical features dialoguing with nature". Due to the station's proximity to Elephant Mountain, it is close to the protected habitat of Taipei tree frogs. Artwork presents natural features and various poses of tree frogs.

Around the Station

 Elephant Mountain (Exit 2)
 Xiangshan Park (Exit 2)
 Sanzhangli Park (Exit 2)
 Taipei Municipal Xingya Junior High School (Exit 3)
 Bo'ai Elementary School (Exit 3)
 Four YouBike Stations

References

2013 establishments in Taiwan
Railway stations opened in 2013
Tamsui–Xinyi line stations